Rhodocactus is a genus of flowering plant in the cactus family Cactaceae, native to central South America.  Unlike most species of cacti, Rhodocactus has persistent leaves and a fully tree-like habit. The genus was sunk into a broadly circumscribed Pereskia, but molecular phylogenetic studies from 2005 onwards showed that with this circumscription Pereskia was paraphyletic, and in 2016, Rhodocactus was restored for southern South American species.

Description
Like all cacti, Rhodocactus species have a succulent habit and specialized structures, areoles, that bear spines. They differ from most cacti in having persistent leaves. When mature, their stems develop bark, but its development is delayed, and all the species other than Rhodocactus nemorosus retain stomata. The areoles of Rhodocactus species can form "brachyblasts", called "spur shoots" by Beat Leuenberger. The areole initially forms in the axil of a leaf (stage A in the diagram below). This leaf may be lost, leaving a leaf scar, and leaves may grow on the areole (stage B). The areole may then grow out to form a brachyblast – a short, very crowded shoot that bears leaves (stage C). Later this may form a longer, but still short shoot that has its own areoles (stage D). Asai and Miyata regard the formation of brachyblast leaves as a distinguishing characteristic of the genus in comparison to Pereskia.

Taxonomy

Rhodocactus was originally described as a subgenus of Pereskia by Alwin Berger, and was raised to a genus in 1936 by Frederik Marcus Knuth. The genus was later sunk back into in a broadly defined genus Pereskia. Molecular phylogenetic studies from 2005 onwards suggested that when circumscribed in this way, Pereskia was not monophyletic, and consisted of three clades. By 2016, each clade was recognized as a separate genus, one of which is Rhodocactus. Only the type species of Knuth's circumscription of the genus, Rhodocactus grandifolius, belongs to the clade re-described as Rhodocactus. The other species were mostly newly transferred from Pereskia.

A consensus cladogram from a 2005 study is shown below with the more recent generic assignments added. It shows that the three genera are basal to the rest of the cacti.

Species
, Plants of the World Online accepted the following species:

Species that have also been placed in Rhodocactus include:
Rhodocactus bleo (F.M.Knuth) F.M.Knuth = Leuenbergeria bleo F.M.Knuth) Lodé
Rhodocactus guamacho (F.A.C.Weber) F.M.Knuth = Leuenbergeria guamacho (F.A.C.Weber) Lodé
Rhodocactus horridus (DC.) F.M.Knuth = Pereskia horrida D.C.
Rhodocactus lychnidiflorus (D.C.) F.M.Knuth = Leuenbergeria lychnidiflora (D.C.) Lodé
Rhodocactus portulacifolius (L.) F.M.Knuth = Leuenbergeria portulacifolia (L.) Lodé
Rhodocactus zinniiflorus (D.C.) F.M.Knuth = Leuenbergeria zinniiflora (D.C.) Lodé

References

Pereskioideae
Cactaceae genera